Ageha Tanigawa (谷川亜華葉, Tanigawa Ageha, born 15 June 2003) is a Japanese swimmer. She competed in the 2020 Summer Olympics in the 400 m individual medley.

References

External links
 
 
 

2003 births
Living people
Japanese female medley swimmers
Olympic swimmers of Japan
Swimmers at the 2020 Summer Olympics
21st-century Japanese women